"If I Had You" is a song written by Kerry Chater and Danny Mayo, and recorded by American country music group Alabama.  It was released in February 1989 as the second single from the album Southern Star.  The song was Alabama's twenty-fifth number one on the country chart.  The single went number one for one week and spent thirteen weeks on the country chart.

The song was covered by Andy Williams on his 1991 album Nashville and Eddy Arnold on his 1993 album Last of the Love Song Singers: Then and Now.

Chart performance

Year-end charts

References

1989 singles
Alabama (American band) songs
Andy Williams songs
Eddy Arnold songs
Songs written by Danny Mayo
Song recordings produced by Barry Beckett
Song recordings produced by Josh Leo
RCA Records singles
Songs written by Kerry Chater
1989 songs